India paper is a type of paper which from 1875 has been based on bleached hemp and rag fibres, that produced a very thin, tough opaque white paper. It has a basis weight of 20 pounds (30 g/m2), yet bulks 1,000 pages to the inch.

It became popular in particular for the printing of Bibles, which could be made relatively small and light while remaining legible. The 1911 Encyclopædia Britannica boasted, "Printed on thin, but strong opaque India paper, each volume but one inch in thickness." The process was used particularly by the Oxford University Press and its paper suppliers. The name arose because the paper imitated fine papers imported from the Indian subcontinent.

India paper has also often been used for the printing of die proofs of postage stamps.

References

See also
Bible paper
Onionskin

Paper